Kwak Jun-hyeok is an Associate Professor of Political Science at Korea University, where he has taught political philosophy and theory since Fall 2007. He also serves as Director of EAI Center for Values & Ethics and Head of Center for Political Theory, Peace and Democracy Institute at Korea University. He received his Ph.D. from the University of Chicago in 2002. Before joining the faculty at Korea University, he taught political thought at Kyungpook National University. His research interests lie at the crossroads of political thought from Socrates to Machiavelli and contemporary political/social theory, with concentration on republicanism, nationalism, constitutionalism, democratic leadership, and human rights. He teaches classes on constitutionalism and democracy, multiculturalism, politics and rhetoric, human rights, and classical and medieval political thought.

His research currently focuses on constructing reciprocal nondomination as a regulative principle that guides agonistic deliberation between peoples in conflict as well as cultures in tension, with special but not exclusive attention to classical republicans, such as Aristotle, Cicero, and Machiavelli. Besides, he inquires a way in which reciprocal nondomination can be applicable to various subjects, including patriotism without nationalism, deliberative democracy, democratic authority, civic responsibility, transnationalism, and multicultural coexistence, etc.. He is now working on books entitled, Liberty as Nondomination: Reconsidering Classical Republicanism, Machiavelli’s Silence, and Patriotism before Nationalism, and running projects “Inherited Responsibility” and “Republican Leadership.”

Education 
Ph.D. Department of Political Science, University of Chicago, August 2002 - Dissertation Title (Political Theory): Managing Political Transformation: “Revolution” in Machiavelli’s Discorsi
M.A. Department of Political Science, Korea University, March 1993
B.A. Department of Political Science, Korea University, March 1991

Academic Awards and Fellowships 
 EAI ASI (Asia Security Initiative) Scholarship, MacArthur Foundation, 2009.
 POSCO Asia Research Grant 2007.
 The Lynde and Harry Bradley Foundation Dissertation Fellowship, 1999-2001.
 Mellon Foundation First-Year Dissertation Award 1998.
 University of Chicago Graduate Fellowship 1996-1999.
 Sasakawa Award (excellent MA thesis), Korea University, 1994.

Papers 
 "The Politics of Aspiration". Japanese Journal of Political Thought. No. 10, (2010), pp. 153–182. [Japanese]
 "Political Philosophy of Niccolò Machiavelli", Understanding Human Being through Classics. Kyungpook National University Press (March 2010, Forthcoming). [Korean]
 "Civic Education and South Korea: Interview with Professor Amy Gutmann", The Journal of Asiatic Studies. Vol. 52, No. 4 (2009), pp. 75–109. [Korean]
 "Politics of Aspiration: Machiavelli and Classical Republicanism", Korean Journal of Political Science. Vol. 17, No. 2 (2009) [Korean]
"Democracy and South Korea: Interview with Professor Chantal Mouffe," The Journal of Asiatic Studies, Vol. 52, No. 3 (2009), pp. 129–186.
"Coexistence without Principle: Reconsidering Multicultural Policies in Japan," Pacific Focus, Vol. 24, No. 2 (2009), pp. 161–186.
"Nationalism and South Korea: Interview with Professor David Miller," The Journal of Asiatic Studies, Vol. 52, No. 2 (2009), pp. 99–139.

Books 
 
Kyŏngkye wa P’yŏn’gyŏn ŭl nŏmŏsŏ (Beyond Boundary and Prejudice), (Seoul: Han’gilsa, 2010) [Korean]
 Konghwa juŭi wa jŏngch'i iron, trans. Kwak Jun-hyeok, Jo Gye-won, and Hong Seung-hun, Seoul: Kach'i, 2009 (Republicanism and Political Theory, Cecile Laborde and Jon Maynor eds., London: Blackwell, 2008). [in Korean]
 Is Electoral System Democratic?, trans. Kwak Jun-hyeok, Seoul: Humanitas, 2004 (The Principles of Representative Government, Bernard Manin, New York: Cambridge, 1997). [in Korean]

References

External links 
Prof. Kwak's personal website
Center For Values and Ethics at East Asia Institute website 

Year of birth missing (living people)
Living people
21st-century philosophers
Korea University alumni
Academic staff of Korea University
Political philosophers
University of Chicago alumni
Bradley Foundation Fellows